"In Camelot" is the 59th episode of the HBO original series The Sopranos and the seventh of the show's fifth season. Written by Terence Winter and directed by Steve Buscemi, it originally aired on April 18, 2004.

Starring
 James Gandolfini as Tony Soprano
 Lorraine Bracco as Dr. Jennifer Melfi 
 Edie Falco as Carmela Soprano
 Michael Imperioli as Christopher Moltisanti
 Dominic Chianese as Corrado Soprano, Jr. 
 Steven Van Zandt as Silvio Dante
 Tony Sirico as Paulie Gualtieri *
 Robert Iler as Anthony Soprano, Jr. 
 Jamie-Lynn Sigler as Meadow Soprano
 Drea de Matteo as Adriana La Cerva *
 Aida Turturro as Janice Soprano Baccalieri
 Steven R. Schirripa as Bobby Baccalieri
 Vincent Curatola as Johnny Sack
 John Ventimiglia as Artie Bucco
 Kathrine Narducci as Charmaine Bucco
 Steve Buscemi as Tony Blundetto
* = credit only

Guest starring
 Jerry Adler as Hesh Rabkin

Also guest starring

Synopsis
Tony's Aunt Concetta dies. After the funeral, Tony happens to meet Fran Felstein, his father's longtime comàre, at his father's grave. They continue to meet, and Tony learns more about his father from her. He learns that, pressured by his mother Livia, his father took his childhood dog Tippy away; he gave it to Fran, and it became her son's dog. Fran also remembers Junior who, she says, almost used to stalk her; Junior tells Tony he loved her but was not bold enough to tell her. Fran also tells Tony about a one-time fling with President John F. Kennedy.

Tony and Fran tour a midget car racetrack in New Egypt; she has explained that Tony's father had promised to leave her a share of the racetrack, but that Phil and Hesh Rabkin cheated her out of it. Tony undertakes to collect the money on her behalf and has a sitdown with Phil and Hesh, mediated by Johnny. While Hesh agrees to pay, Phil objects to paying 25% and delays payment. When Tony spots him in the street, there is a car chase that ends with Phil crashing into a truck. Later, Tony is able to collect $150,000 for Fran.

Junior, with his mental health and memory now improved due to new medication, says he is going stir crazy while still under house arrest. He begins going to every funeral he can, even when he knows the deceased only slightly, just to get out of the house. However, at the funeral of Concetta's husband, who died shortly after his wife, Junior begins crying uncontrollably and has to be helped away by Bobby and Janice. Junior later breaks down in his physician's office when he mentions the lack of purpose in his life.

Christopher begins to spend time with J.T. Dolan, a television screenwriter he met in rehab. The two offer to support one another when they get the urge to use. After he loses a sports bet to J.T., Chris introduces him to the family's high-stakes poker games. J.T. runs up $60,000 in debt and starts missing payments; Chris and Little Paulie go to his apartment and beat him up. J.T. loses some writing jobs, causing him to turn to heroin. Chris then helps direct him back toward rehab.

Tony's friendship with Fran begins to sour as he learns that his father was often with her when he was needed, including the night Livia was hospitalized for a miscarriage; on that occasion, Tony had to lie to his mother to protect his father. Furthermore, Fran starts to openly disparage Livia to Tony and, after claiming she was broke, buys expensive clothes with the money he obtained for her. Dr. Melfi suggests he could have more sympathy for Livia, forgive her, and forget. Tony remains unsympathetic, saying that Livia did make his father give Tippy away. As the episode closes, Tony starts regaling his buddies at the Bada Bing with exaggerated accounts of Fran's involvement with JFK.

First appearances
 J.T. Dolan: Christopher's Alcoholics Anonymous friend, who is also a screenwriter.
 Burt Gervasi: Cousin of Carlo Gervasi, and associate in the Soprano Family.

Deceased
This episode had five deaths, the most in the series, although they all happened offscreen and none of them were murders.
 Aunt Concetta: died of a heart attack
 Vincent Patronella: claimed by Junior to be a distant relation
 Mrs. Crilli: sister of Uncle Junior's cousin by marriage
 Unnamed Boy: 7 years old, died in a jacuzzi; "son of Sal from the dry-cleaners"
 Uncle Nicolo "Zio" Concetta: husband of Concetta

Production
 Although the seventh episode of the season, it was produced sixth, due to scheduling availability of previous episode director Peter Bogdanovich, as episode director Steve Buscemi wanted to direct an episode in which his character was minimally featured.

Title reference
 Fran Felstein claimed to have had an affair with President John F. Kennedy, whose administration was nicknamed "Camelot."

Connections to prior episodes
 JFK's United States Navy uniform hat was also worn by Irina in the series pilot.

Cultural references
 The Baccalieri children are watching Beethoven on TV when Tony pays the family a visit.
 Aunt Concetta reportedly had a heart attack and died after watching Meet the Press.
 During Tony's flashback scene to 1975, his teenage self is watching the Cannon episode "Man in the Middle" when his father calls.
 At the reception after Concetta’s funeral, Junior wants to sing a song with his table, starting to sing “Volare,” but stops after no one follows along.
 J.T. Dolan mentions he wrote for Nash Bridges and That's Life, and Christopher comments he thought the latter show was unrealistic.  Christopher also makes disparaging remarks about director Jon Favreau who is featured in the second-season episode "D-Girl."
 Dolan says his agent is working to get him a job writing for Law & Order, created by Dick Wolf.
 Dolan has a framed poster of Dr. Strangelove hanging in his apartment, which Christopher and Little Paulie later smash over his head when they beat him up.
 Dolan later tries to sell his Emmy Award at the pawnshop for some money, but the clerk only offers a few dollars for it, saying it is no Academy Award.
 Fran Felstein mentions going to see Enzo Stuarti sing at Manhattan's famous Copacabana in the 1950s.
 The racetrack that Tony and Fran visit is referred to in the episode as "Chikamauga Raceway in New Egypt." While scenes at the track were filmed at Riverhead Raceway in Riverhead, New York, New Egypt is home to the New Egypt Speedway.
 When Tony shows Fran JFK's hat, she sings "Happy Birthday, Mr. President" by Marilyn Monroe to him.
 Dolan plays the computer game Snood on his laptop and mentions Pulp Fiction.

Music
 Kylie Minogue's "Can't Get You Out of My Head" is playing when Chris and J.T. are in the gym.
 The song playing when Chris and J.T. talk at the Bada Bing is "Tongue" by Johnny Heartsman.
 The song blaring from Tony's stereo as he pursues Leotardo is "Rock the Casbah" by The Clash.
 When Tony takes Fran Felstein to dinner, the title track from John Coltrane's album My Favorite Things is playing.
 The song played at the Bada Bing at the end of the episode, when Tony is exaggerating Fran's exploits with JFK, is "Session" by Linkin Park, from their album Meteora.
 The song played over the end credits is "Melancholy Serenade", the theme from The Jackie Gleason Show, which was composed by Gleason.  Fran said that Gleason was present at the March 1961 party at which she met President Kennedy. Other references to Gleason are made throughout the show (e.g., at Tony B's homecoming party at the Bing).
 During a flashback scene of Johnny Soprano, the song "Misty Blue" by Dorothy Moore is playing in the background.

References

External links
"In Camelot"  at HBO

The Sopranos (season 5) episodes
2004 American television episodes
Television episodes about funerals
Television episodes written by Terence Winter